This is a list of the coups d'état (both plots, failed and successful attempts and armed conflicts) that have taken place in Chile, during its independent history. The 1973 Chilean coup d'état stands out being the last one as well as one of the most violent and with more far-reaching impact in the history of Chile.

1780s
Conspiracy of the Tres Antonios, (1781) – A failed attempt to declare Chile an independent republic

1810s
Government Junta of Chile, (September 18, 1810) – A successful coup in favor of home rule in Chile
Figueroa mutiny, (April 1, 1811) – A failed attempt to restore royal power in Chile
1811 Chilean coup d'état, (September 4, 1811) – A successful coup in favor of José Miguel Carrera

1820s
Campino mutiny, (1827) – A failed attempt to destroy the opposition to the federalist system 
San Fernando mutiny, (June, 1828) of Pedro Urriola, José Antonio Vidaurre and the Maipo Battalion.
Chilean Civil War of 1829, (1829) – An armed conflict between conservatives and liberals over the constitutional regime

1830s
Arauco rebellion, (1831) of Pedro Barnechea and Captain Uriarte
Rebellion of Cazadores de Quechereguas Regiment, (1832) – Under Cap. Eusebio Ruiz
Arteaga Conspiracy, (1833), – of General Zenteno and Coronel Picarte
Cotapos revolution, (1833), – of José Antonio Pérez de Cotapos
Freire expedition, (1836) – An invasion of Chiloé Island and failed attempt to depose the government
Quillota mutiny, (1837) – A failed attempt to depose the government that resulted in the death of Diego Portales

1850s
1851 Chilean Revolution, (1851) – An armed rebellion by liberals against the conservative President Manuel Montt
1859 Chilean Revolution, (1859) – A rekindling of the armed rebellion by liberals against the conservative President Manuel Montt started in 1851

1890s
1891 Chilean Civil War, (1891) – An armed conflict between forces supporting National Congress and forces that supported President José Manuel Balmaceda
Several Balmacedist plots, (1891–94) – Planned by Hernán Abos-Padilla, Nicanor Donoso, Diego Bahamondes, Luis Leclerc, Herminio Euth, José Domingo Briceño, Edmundo Pinto, Manuel and Emilio Rodríguez, Virgilio Talquino and Anselmo Blanlot against the new government

1910s
Military League plot, (1912) – A failed plot against President Ramon Barros Luco. In September, Gonzalo Bulnes the appointed leader of the plot, desisted.
Armstrong-Moore plot, (1919) – A failed plot by Generals Guillermo Armstrong and Manuel Moore against President Juan Luis Sanfuentes

1920s
1924 Chilean coup d'état, (September 5, 1924) – A successful coup against President Arturo Alessandri
1925 Chilean coup d'état, (January 23, 1925) – A successful coup in which Carlos Ibáñez del Campo and Marmaduke Grove overthrew Luis Altamirano to return President Arturo Alessandri to office

1930s
Little red plane plot, (September 21, 1930) – A failed attempt against President Carlos Ibáñez del Campo by Marmaduke Grove
Fall of Carlos Ibáñez del Campo, 26 Jule 1931, successful rebellion against Ibañez
Chilean naval mutiny of 1931, (September, 1931) – A rebellion in the Chilean Navy against Vice-President Manuel Trucco that ended with the fleet being bombed from the air.
Norte Grande insurrection, (December 25, 1931) – A failed Communist push against President Juan Esteban Montero
1932 Chilean coup d'état, (June 4, 1932) – A successful coup that resulted in the instauration of the Socialist Republic of Chile, in which Marmaduke Grove overthrows Juan Esteban Montero
Antofagasta coup d'état, (September 27, 1932) – A successful coup of General Pedro Vignola that resulted in the resignation of President Bartolomé Blanche and the return to civilian rule
Las Mercedes' plot, (1933) – A failed plot against President Arturo Alessandri. Commander-in-Chief of the Army, Pedro Vignola called "to resist the Milicia Republicana by any means"
Humberto Videla's plot, (1935) – failed rebellion of NCO's
1936 plot against Alessandri, (1936) – By René Silva Espejo and Alejandro Lagos
Seguro Obrero massacre, (September 5, 1938) – A failed National Socialist attempt in favor of Carlos Ibáñez that resulted in the murder of 59 young party members
Ariostazo, (August 25, 1939) – A failed attempt of Ariosto Herrera against President Pedro Aguirre Cerda

1940s
Pig trotters' plot, (1948) – A failed plot against President Gabriel González Videla

1950s
Línea Recta affair, (1954) – A failed plot to allow President Carlos Ibáñez del Campo to assume dictatorial powers

1970s
Tanquetazo, (June 29, 1973) – A failed coup against President Salvador Allende
1973 Chilean coup d'état, (September 11, 1973) – A successful coup against President Salvador Allende (resulting in his death), in favor of Augusto Pinochet

See also
Presidents of Chile timeline
List of coups d'état and coup attempts
List of coups d'état and coup attempts by country

References

18th century in Chile
19th century in Chile
20th century in Chile

Chile history-related lists
Chile politics-related lists
Government of Chile
Political history of Chile
Lists of military conflicts
Politics of Chile
Coups d'etat
Chili